David Webster Hillman (born c. 1944) is an American farmer and politician from Almyra, Arkansas, who is a Republican member of the Arkansas House of Representatives. He has represented District 13 in the southeastern portion of his state since January 14, 2013.

Elected as a Democrat in all past elections, Hillman announced his change to the Republican Party on November 22, 2016.

Education
Hillman graduated from Ouachita Baptist University in Arkadelphia, Arkansas.

2012 Election

When District 13 Representative Clark Hall ran for United States House of Representatives and left the seat open, Hillman was unopposed for the May 22, 2012 Democratic Primary, and won the November 6, 2012 General election with 4,897 votes (51.1%) against Republican nominee Garland Derden.

2022 Election

After the Arkansas Legislature changed the Arkansas House of Representatives map due to redistricting as a result of the 2020 US Census, Hillman decided to run as the incumbent Republican representative in the new 61st district (having changed his political identification from Democratic to Republican in 2016). He was defeated in the Republican primary on May 24th by Jeremiah Moore, a real estate broker and political newcomer, 57%-30%.

References

External links
Official page  at the Arkansas House of Representatives

David Hillman at Ballotpedia
David Hillman at OpenSecrets

1944 births
Place of birth missing (living people)
Living people
People from Arkansas County, Arkansas
Farmers from Arkansas
Arkansas Democrats
Arkansas Republicans
Members of the Arkansas House of Representatives
Ouachita Baptist University alumni
Baptists from Arkansas
21st-century American politicians